Calceolaria serrata is a species of plant in the Calceolariaceae family. It is endemic to Ecuador.

References

serrata
Endemic flora of Ecuador
Vulnerable flora of South America
Taxonomy articles created by Polbot